Linhexi Station is an interchange station on Line 3 and Zhujiang New Town Automated People Mover Systems on the Guangzhou Metro. It started operation in 26December 2005 and is located underground the junction of Tianhe Road North and Linhe West Road in the Tianhe District.

Station layout

Around the station
 CITIC Plaza

References

Railway stations in China opened in 2005
Guangzhou Metro stations in Tianhe District